Cryptarius daugeti is a species of sea catfish from the Mekong River basin which inhabits large rivers. It is found in brackish and fresh waters of Cambodia and Vietnam. This species has a maximum length of 26 centimetres (10 in) TL.

References

Ariidae
Fish of Asia
Fish described in 1932